Fusafungine (INN), also known as fusafungin, is an active agent used in antibiotics for treatment of nasal and throat infection. It also possesses anti-inflammatory properties. Fusafungine is a mixture of enniatin cyclohexadepsipeptides made up of alternating D-α-hydroxyvaleric acid and L-N-methylamino acid residues, produced by the ascomycete Fusarium lateritium, and marketed by Servier under the trade names Locabiotal, Bioparox, and Locabiosol.

According to a pooled analysis study done in the UK for the efficacy of fusafungine in rhinopharingitis, it was found that the proportion of patients who showed an improvement in symptoms from Day 0 to Day 4 of infection was 61.5% with fusafungine vs. 46.8% when compared to a placebo.

In February 2016, the European Medicines Agency recommended the withdrawal of fusafungine from the market due to rare but severe allergic reactions (mainly bronchospasms).

References 

Antimicrobial peptides
Depsipeptides